Hylicinae is a subfamily in the family Cicadellidae (leafhoppers).

Description
Hylicine leafhoppers are moderately robust insects and are brownish to greyish in colouration. They feed on Dicotyledon trees and shrubs.

Distribution
This subfamily is mostly confined to the Afrotropical and Indomalayan regions.

Tribes and genera
There are three tribes in the subfamily.

Hylicini
Erected by Distant in 1908.
 Assiringia Distant, 1908
 Hylica Stål, 1863
 Traiguma Distant, 1908
 Wolfella Spinola, 1850

Malmaemichungiini
Erected by Metcalf in 1962. It is monotypic.
 Melliola Hedicke, 1923

Sudrini
Erected by Schmidt, E. in 1962.
 Balala Distant, 1908
 Hatigoria Distant, 1908
 Hemisudra Schmidt, E., 1911
  Kalasha Distant, 1908
 Karasekia Melichar, 1912
 Nacolus Jacobi, 1914
 Parasudra Schmidt, E., 1909
 Pseudosudra Schmidt, E., 1920
  Sudra Distant, 1908

References

Cicadellidae
Hemiptera subfamilies